Lason is a provider of document management outsourcing services, including imaging, mail processing, data capture, document DNATM, and output. Lason has 35+ North American offices, with facilities in Mexico, China, and India which provide data and document-intensive organizations. Client control centers located in Troy, Michigan and Toronto, Ontario provide clients with North American-based, English-speaking management.

Lason's blue-chip customer base includes many of the Fortune 1000, and spans several markets, including healthcare, insurance, financial services, electronic publishing, and government. The company was listed at number 19 on The Global Outsourcing 100 list by the International Association of Outsourcing Professionals.
 
Recently, Lason was acquired by HOV Services Limited, a global business process outsourcing company that operates in North America with multiple locations in the U.S. and headquarters in Pune, India. The two companies combined will have trailing annual revenues in excess of $200 million, and a global workforce of more than 11,000 employees serving more than 50% of the Fortune 100 companies with an active client base numbering over 4,000. It is a multinational company.

See also
HOV Services

References

External links
Lason website

Multinational companies
Outsourcing companies